In mathematics, an isomorphism class is a collection of mathematical objects isomorphic to each other.

Isomorphism classes are often defined as the exact identity of the elements of the set is considered irrelevant, and the properties of the structure of the mathematical object are studied.  Examples of this are ordinals and graphs.  However, there are circumstances in which the isomorphism class of an object conceals vital internal information about it; consider these examples:
 The associative algebras consisting of coquaternions and 2 × 2 real matrices are isomorphic as rings. Yet they appear in different contexts for application (plane mapping and kinematics) so the isomorphism is insufficient to merge the concepts.
In homotopy theory, the fundamental group of a space  at a point , though technically denoted  to emphasize the dependence on the base point, is often written lazily as simply  if  is path connected. The reason for this is that the existence of a path between two points allows one to identify loops at one with loops at the other; however, unless  is abelian this isomorphism is non-unique.

References

Abstract algebra